, known mononymously as Momo, is a Japanese singer, rapper, and dancer based in South Korea. She is one of the three Japanese members of South Korean girl group Twice under JYP Entertainment.

Life and career

Early life and pre-debut activities
Momo Hirai was born in Kyōtanabe, Kyoto Prefecture, Japan. She began dancing at the age of three, together with her elder sister, Hana.

Momo gained exposure to the South Korean music industry early, appearing in a music video for Lexy in 2008 and on the talent show Superstar K in 2011. Momo and her sister were originally spotted by JYP Entertainment in an online video in 2012. They were both asked to audition, although only Momo was successful, prompting her to move to South Korea in April 2012. Before joining Twice, she danced in a number of music videos as a "K-Pop trainee". In 2015, Momo participated in the South Korean reality television show Sixteen, created by JYP Entertainment and co-produced by Mnet. She was initially eliminated from the show but was brought back at the end to become part of the final lineup girl group Twice due to poll feedback from viewers and her performance abilities.

Debut with Twice and MiSaMo 

In October 2015, Momo officially debuted as a member of Twice with the release of their first extended play (EP), The Story Begins, and its lead single "Like Ooh-Ahh". On February 9, 2023, JYP announced that Momo, alongside bandmates Sana and Mina, will officially debut in Japan on July 26 as a sub-unit named MiSaMo with an extended play of six tracks. Prior to the trio's debut, on January 25, they released the track “Bouquet” as part of the soundtrack of TV Asahi’s drama series Liaison: Children’s Heart Clinic.

Artistry
Momo revealed that she was influenced by her older sister Hana from an early age; where she began dancing with her at the age of three. She also revealed that the J-pop singer Namie Amuro is her role model and that she "wanted to be like her someday." She noted that she loves 2ne1 and Rain, explaining, "I always wanted to thrill people with my dance, and K-pop dance thrilled me."

Other ventures

Fashion and endorsements
In 2022, Momo was appointed as the brand muse of Wonjungyo, a cosmetic brand supervised by Wonjungyo, who is in charge of Twice's makeup. In October 2022, she was announced as the brand ambassador of the Japanese sports brand, Onitsuka Tiger.

Public image and influence

Influence
In Gallup Korea's annual music poll for 2018, Momo was voted the 20th most popular idol in South Korea, the second highest-ranked Japanese individual in the poll, behind Twice bandmate Sana. She has been one of the most popular non-Korean K-pop stars since her debut, and the Chosun Ilbo credits her popularity with helping improve relations between South Korea and Japan. In 2019, Momo received attention on Twitter after a video trailer of her was released and ranked as the tenth most popular female K-pop idol in a survey of soldiers completing mandatory military service in South Korea. In 2023, she became the first Japanese person to hit 10 million followers on Instagram.

Public image
Known for her physical fitness and body movements, she was nicknamed "Dance Machine" among her fans and is considered Twice's best dancer.

Discography

Soundtrack appearances

Songwriting credits
All song credits are adapted from the Korea Music Copyright Association's database unless stated otherwise.

Filmography

Television shows

Hosting

References

External links
 

1996 births
Living people
Musicians from Kyoto
K-pop singers
JYP Entertainment artists
Korean-language singers of Japan
Japanese K-pop singers
Japanese women pop singers
21st-century Japanese women singers
21st-century Japanese singers
Momo
Japanese expatriates in South Korea
Japanese female dancers
Japanese dance musicians